Martainville-Épreville is a commune in the Seine-Maritime department in the Normandy region in north-western France.

Geography

Heraldry

Population

Places of interest

 The fifteenth-century castle, with its dovecote, gardens and a museum.
 The churches of St.Ouen and of Notre-Dame, both dating from the seventeenth century.

See also
Communes of the Seine-Maritime department

References

Communes of Seine-Maritime